Pyrolirion, commonly known as fire lilies or flame lilies, is a small genus of herbaceous, bulb-forming  South American plants in the Amaryllis family, native to Chile, Peru, and Bolivia.

Description
Pyrolirion have thin linear leaves that may be pointed at the tips. The flowers, which can vary in coloration, are borne erect on solitary hollow scapes. The perigone is funnel-shaped, with a cylindrical tube that flares out abruptly to star-like radially arranged (actinomorphic) petals. Small scale-like "paraperigone" may be present at the base.

The stamens arise from or below the throat. The style has three branches at the tip with spoon-shaped (spatulate) stigmas. The seeds are laterally compressed, colored black with white seams (raphe).

Systematics
The genus Pyrolirion was first established by the British botanist William Herbert in 1837. The name Pyrolirion is from Greek πῦρ (pyr, "fire") and λείριον (leirion, "lily"). It is named after the flame-like colors of the flowers of Pyrolirion arvense (the golden flame lily).

Pyrolirion is classified under the tribe Eustephieae of the subfamily Amaryllidoideae, family Amaryllidaceae. It was previously sometimes considered by some authors as a subgenus of Zephyranthes (rain lilies), but DNA sequencing has shown that it is a distinct genus more closely related to the genera Chlidanthus, Eustephia, and Hieronymiella in the tribe Eustephieae than to members of the tribe Hippeastreae.

Species
The species-level classification of Pyrolirion is unclear and in need of further study. The following are accepted at present (April 2015)
 Pyrolirion albicans Herb. - Perú (Arequipa)
 Pyrolirion arvense (F.Dietr.) - Perú (Cusco, Lima)
 Pyrolirion boliviense (Baker) Sealy  - Bolivia (Cochabamba, La Paz)
 Pyrolirion cutleri (Cárdenas) Ravenna  - Bolivia (Cochabamba)
 Pyrolirion flavum Herb.  - Perú (Cusco, Lima)
 Pyrolirion huantae Ravenna - Perú
 Pyrolirion tarahuasicum Ravenna - Perú
 Pyrolirion tubiflorum (L'Hér.) M.Roem.  - Perú, Chile

References

Amaryllidoideae
Amaryllidaceae genera
Flora of South America